The MI 2N "Altéo" (French: Matériel d'Interconnexion à 2 Niveaux, English: two-level interconnection rolling stock), also known as the Class Z 1500 is a double-deck, dual-voltage electric multiple unit trainset that is operated on line A of the Réseau Express Régional (RER), a hybrid suburban commuter and rapid transit system serving Paris and its Île-de-France suburbs. The trains are RATPs version of the MI 2N and looks similar to the other variant, the SNCF Class Z 22500 (MI 2N "Eole") trains, but each features different motorization and interior layout.

The 43 five-car trains were built by a consortium of French manufacturer Alstom (then known as GEC Alsthom) and Canadian conglomerate Bombardier. The final assembly of the trains was performed at Alstom's Valenciennes factory and Bombardier's Crespin factory between 1995 and 2005.

The double-decker trains grew out of an effort to increase capacity on the RER A line, one of the world's busiest routes. These trains could carry up to 2,600 people per train, compared to 1,887 people on the single-deck trains that had been used on the RER A since it opened. These double-deck trains proved so successful and popular, operators of the RER A went on to purchase 140 MI 09 trainsets, an improved version of the MI 2N that would be built by the same Alstom-Bombardier consortium.

History 

The Réseau Express Régional (RER) is a hybrid suburban commuter and rapid transit system serving Paris and its suburbs. The RER A line is, by far, the busiest in the system and is the busiest single rail line outside of East Asia, serving over 1.2 million passengers per day.

The line started experiencing rapid growth in the 1980s, with traffic increasing by 9% per year on average. In an effort to relieve overcrowding on the line, the RATP began installing the SACEM electronic train control system (which enabled extremely short spacing between trains) and started looking at purchasing double-deck trains.

Double-deck trains, like the Z 2N series (Class Z 5600 and Class Z 8800) were already in use on suburban SNCF networks and could carry up to 2,600 people per train, compared to 1,887 people on the single-deck MS 61 trains that had been used on the RER A since it opened.

At about the same time, the RATP started construction of the Paris Métro Line 14, and SNCF started construction of the RER E line. Both would parallel the RER A in central Paris.

That left the RATP and the SNCF looking for new equipment for the RER A and E lines, so in 1989 they decided to team up and issue a call for tenders. In 1992, they placed an order for 17 MI 2N trainsets from a consortium of French manufacturer Alstom (at the time known as GEC Alstom) and Canadian conglomerate Bombardier. The MI 2N would be based on the design of SNCF's Class Z 20500 trains being built by the same consortium for RER C and RER D lines, but with modifications to make them better suited to the busy RER A line, most notably three wide doors on each side of the cars (the Z 2N only had two).

The RATP trains for the RER A would be called the MI 2N "Altéo", while the SNCF trains for the RER E would be called the Class Z 22500, also known as the MI 2N "Eole" (EOLE was the name of the RER E during construction). The two trains look very similar from the outside, but the "Altéo" trains for the RER A would feature three motors per trainset for faster acceleration, while the "Eole" trains would only have two motors, and would eliminate the stairs between the upper deck and the center vestibule in favor of having 22 additional seats per train.

A pre-production train was delivered in 1996 for joint testing by both RATP and SNCF. The first order of 17 trainsets was delivered between 1997 and 1999, and the first train was put into service on 6 June 1997. RATP proceeded with a second option order of 12 trainsets, delivered between 2001 and 2002, and a third option order of 14 trainsets, delivered between 2003 and 2005.

The double-deck trains proved so successful and popular that operators of the RER A went on to purchase 140 MI 09 trainsets, an improved version of the MI 2N built by the same Alstom-Bombardier consortium.
[[|thumb|Departure sound Mi2N Altéo in exterior at Chatelet les Halles]]

Renovations 
Starting in 2019, the 43 MI 2N Altéo trains are scheduled to undergo a renovation project that will modernize the cars' interior (replacement of seats and floor coverings, improved lighting, new multi-purpose areas), the installation of a video surveillance system, the improvement of accessibility for passengers with reduced mobility (adding a call button for passengers in wheelchairs and improved loudspeaker system) and the improvement of the on-board passenger information system. The exterior of the train will also receive the new Île-de-France Mobilités livery (grey, white and light blue) that other forms of public transportation in Paris are now receiving. The €134 million renovation contract was awarded to CAF and will be paid for by RATP and Île-de-France Mobilités. The first renovated trains are expected to enter revenue service by early 2023.

Description 
Altéos are able to operate on two different types of electrical power: RATP's 1.5 kV DC network and SNCF's 25 kV AC network. The trains primarily operate using 1.5 kV DC, except when operating over the western A3 and A5 branches (between Houilles–Carrières-sur-Seine station and Cergy-le-Haut station or Poissy station).

Altéos made their commercial debut on 6 June 1997. 43 trainsets with a total of 215 cars were built for the RER A line.

Formations 
As of 1 March 2022, 43 MI 2N Altéo trainsets were based at the Achères, Rueil-Malmaison, Sucy-en-Brie and Torcy RATP depots.

As shown below, the trainsets are formed with three motored cars and two non-powered (trailer) cars (3M2T).

 < or > show a pantograph. Cars 1 and 5 were each equipped with one pantograph.

Fleet
The number of Mi2N Altéo trainsets is 43, numbered 1501/02 to 1585/86. All are in service on line A of the Île-de-France RER.

Listing Fleet Mi2N (in french)

Photo gallery

References

External links 
MI 2N page on Metro-pole.net 

SNCF multiple units
Double-decker EMUs
Electric multiple units of France
25 kV AC multiple units
1500 V DC multiple units of France